Newthorpe is a mainly rural area lying alongside the B1222 road to the west of Sherburn in Elmet village and stretching across to the A1(M) Motorway in the English county of North Yorkshire.

It is part of the civil parish of Huddleston with Newthorpe that forms part of the district of Selby.

The village was historically part of the West Riding of Yorkshire until 1974.

References

External links

Selby District
Villages in North Yorkshire